Wolica  is a village in the administrative district of Gmina Godziesze Wielkie, within Kalisz County, Greater Poland Voivodeship, in west-central Poland.

In 2005 the village had a population of 820.

References

Wolica